Yuanfuliite is a black submetal mineral. The mineral is named after the geologist Yuan Fuli.

It can be found in places like Russia, Sakha Republic, and Siberia.

It occurs in metamorphosed magnesium marble.

References

External links
 Mindat.org: Yuanfuliite

Borates